Romuald Désiré Peiser (born 3 August 1979) is a French former professional footballer who played as a goalkeeper. He currently serves as the goalkeeper coach for CF Montreal of the MLS.

Football career
Peiser was born in Phalsbourg, Moselle. After unsuccessfully emerging through Paris Saint-Germain FC's youth system – only appeared for the reserves – he played in Germany with Bayer Leverkusen II and KFC Uerdingen, both in the lower leagues; subsequently, he spent one season in the Swiss Challenge League with FC Vaduz.

Peiser made his top flight debut in the 2003–04 campaign, only missing four Liga I games as FC Rapid București finished in third position. He returned to his country for the following four years, spending two apiece with Troyes AC and FC Gueugnon and being part of the former team's Ligue 1 roster in 2005–06 (no league appearances).

In 2008, aged 29, Peiser moved countries again, going on to start for both Portuguese sides he represented, Associação Naval 1º de Maio and Académica de Coimbra, both in the Primeira Liga. His first match in the competition took place on 4 October 2008 while at the service of the former, in a 1–1 home draw to C.F. Os Belenenses.

On 9 July 2014, Peiser signed with his first non-European club, joining Ottawa Fury FC of the North American Soccer League. In July of the following year, he broke a record in the competition – in both the original and modern-day incarnation – for the longest shutout record.

In December 2016, 37-year-old Peiser moved to fellow league team San Francisco Deltas. He won the Soccer Bowl in his first season, keeping a clean sheet in the decisive match against New York Cosmos (2–0 at the Kezar Stadium).

In March 2018, Peiser signed with United Soccer League side Penn FC. After retiring later in that year, he worked as goalkeeper coach at Sacramento Republic FC.

On June 4, 2021, he was hired to be the new goalkeeper coach for CF Montreal.

Honours

Club
Académica
Taça de Portugal: 2011–12

Ottawa Fury
North American Soccer League: Fall Championship 2015

San Francisco Deltas
Soccer Bowl: 2017

Individual
NASL Golden Glove: 2015

References

External links

1979 births
Living people
People from Phalsbourg
Sportspeople from Moselle (department)
French footballers
Association football goalkeepers
Ligue 2 players
Paris Saint-Germain F.C. players
ES Troyes AC players
FC Gueugnon players
Bayer 04 Leverkusen II players
KFC Uerdingen 05 players
Swiss Challenge League players
FC Vaduz players
Liga I players
FC Rapid București players
Primeira Liga players
Associação Naval 1º de Maio players
Associação Académica de Coimbra – O.A.F. players
North American Soccer League players
Ottawa Fury FC players
San Francisco Deltas players
Penn FC players
French expatriate footballers
Expatriate footballers in Germany
Expatriate footballers in Liechtenstein
Expatriate footballers in Romania
Expatriate footballers in Portugal
Expatriate soccer players in Canada
Expatriate soccer players in the United States
French expatriate sportspeople in Germany
French expatriate sportspeople in Portugal
French expatriate sportspeople in Canada
French expatriate sportspeople in the United States
French expatriate sportspeople in Liechtenstein
Footballers from Grand Est
French expatriate sportspeople in Romania
Association football goalkeeping coaches